Bezeq International Optical System – JONAH – is a submarine telecommunication cable linking Tel Aviv and Bari. The system, which is fully owned by Israeli communications company Bezeq, spans 2,300 km of cable, and extended terrestrially from Bari through Interoute's network to major European cities.

The system has been ready for commercial service since January 2012, currently operates using 40G channels and can support 100G channels in the future, increasing the ultimate capacity of the cable to over 12.8 terabits per second (Tbit/s), based on Alcatel-Lucent’s submarine communications networking technology.

See also
List of international submarine communications cables
Bezeq

References

External links
Interoute and Bezeq International create a new Internet super highway between Europe and Israel
JONAH Goes Live - Submarine Telecoms Forum

Telecommunications in Israel
Submarine communications cables in the Mediterranean Sea
Israel–Italy relations
2012 establishments in Israel
2012 establishments in Italy